In mathematics, and especially in geometry, an object has icosahedral symmetry if it has the same symmetries as a regular icosahedron. Examples of other polyhedra with icosahedral symmetry include the regular dodecahedron (the dual of the icosahedron) and the rhombic triacontahedron.

Every polyhedron with icosahedral symmetry has 60 rotational (or orientation-preserving) symmetries and 60 orientation-reversing symmetries (that combine a rotation and a reflection), for a total symmetry order of 120.  The full symmetry group is the Coxeter group of type .  It may be represented by Coxeter notation  and Coxeter diagram . The set of rotational symmetries forms a subgroup that is isomorphic to the alternating group  on 5 letters.

Description 
Icosahedral symmetry is a mathematical property of objects indicating that an object has the same symmetries as a regular icosahedron.

As point group 

Apart from the two infinite series of prismatic and antiprismatic symmetry, rotational icosahedral symmetry or chiral icosahedral symmetry of chiral objects and full icosahedral symmetry or achiral icosahedral symmetry are the discrete point symmetries (or equivalently, symmetries on the sphere) with the largest symmetry groups.

Icosahedral symmetry is not compatible with translational symmetry, so there are no associated crystallographic point groups or space groups.

Presentations corresponding to the above are:

These correspond to the icosahedral groups (rotational and full) being the (2,3,5) triangle groups.

The first presentation was given by William Rowan Hamilton in 1856, in his paper on icosian calculus.

Note that other presentations are possible, for instance as an alternating group (for I).

Visualizations
The full symmetry group is the Coxeter group of type .  It may be represented by Coxeter notation  and Coxeter diagram .  The set of rotational symmetries forms a subgroup that is isomorphic to the alternating group  on 5 letters.

Group structure 
Every polyhedron with icosahedral symmetry has 60 rotational (or orientation-preserving) symmetries and 60 orientation-reversing symmetries (that combine a rotation and a reflection), for a total symmetry order of 120.

The  I is of order 60. The group I is isomorphic to A5, the alternating group of even permutations of five objects. This isomorphism can be realized by I acting on various compounds, notably the compound of five cubes (which inscribe in the dodecahedron), the compound of five octahedra, or either of the two compounds of five tetrahedra (which are enantiomorphs, and inscribe in the dodecahedron). The group contains 5 versions of Th with 20 versions of D3 (10 axes, 2 per axis), and 6 versions of D5.

The  Ih has order 120. It has I as normal subgroup of index 2.  The group Ih is isomorphic to I × Z2, or A5 × Z2, with the inversion in the center  corresponding to element (identity,-1), where Z2 is written multiplicatively.

Ih acts on the compound of five cubes and the compound of five octahedra, but −1 acts as the identity (as cubes and octahedra are centrally symmetric). It acts on the compound of ten tetrahedra: I acts on the two chiral halves (compounds of five tetrahedra), and −1 interchanges the two halves.
Notably, it does not act as S5, and these groups are not isomorphic; see below for details.

The group contains 10 versions of D3d and 6 versions of D5d (symmetries like antiprisms).

I is also isomorphic to PSL2(5), but Ih is not isomorphic to SL2(5).

Isomorphism of I with A5 
It is useful to describe explicitly what the isomorphism between I and A5 looks like. In the following table, permutations Pi and Qi act on 5 and 12 elements respectively, while the rotation matrices Mi are the elements of I. If Pk is the product of taking the permutation Pi and applying Pj to it, then for the same values of i, j and k, it is also true that Qk is the product of taking Qi and applying Qj, and also that premultiplying a vector by Mk is the same as premultiplying that vector by Mi and then premultiplying that result with Mj, that is  Mk =  Mj × Mi. Since the permutations Pi are all the 60 even permutations of 12345, the one-to-one correspondence is made explicit, therefore the isomorphism too.

Commonly confused groups 
The following groups all have order 120, but are not isomorphic:
 S5, the symmetric group on 5 elements
 Ih, the full icosahedral group (subject of this article, also known as H3)
 2I, the binary icosahedral group
They correspond to the following short exact sequences (the latter of which does not split) and product

In words,
  is a normal subgroup of 
  is a quotient group of 
Note that  has an exceptional irreducible 3-dimensional representation (as the icosahedral rotation group), but  does not have an irreducible 3-dimensional representation, corresponding to the full icosahedral group not being the symmetric group.

These can also be related to linear groups over the finite field with five elements, which exhibit the subgroups and covering groups directly; none of these are the full icosahedral group:
  the projective special linear group, see here for a proof;
  the projective general linear group;
  the special linear group.

Conjugacy classes 
The 120 symmetries fall into 10 conjugacy classes.

Subgroups of the full icosahedral symmetry group 

Each line in the following table represents one class of conjugate (i.e., geometrically equivalent) subgroups. The column "Mult." (multiplicity) gives the number of different subgroups in the conjugacy class.

Explanation of colors: green = the groups that are generated by reflections, red = the chiral (orientation-preserving) groups, which contain only rotations.

The groups are described geometrically in terms of the dodecahedron.

The abbreviation "h.t.s.(edge)" means "halfturn swapping this edge with its opposite edge", and similarly for "face" and "vertex".

Vertex stabilizers 
Stabilizers of an opposite pair of vertices can be interpreted as stabilizers of the axis they generate.
 vertex stabilizers in I give cyclic groups C3
 vertex stabilizers in Ih give dihedral groups D3
 stabilizers of an opposite pair of vertices in I give dihedral groups D3
 stabilizers of an opposite pair of vertices in Ih give

Edge stabilizers 
Stabilizers of an opposite pair of edges can be interpreted as stabilizers of the rectangle they generate.
 edges stabilizers in I give cyclic groups Z2
 edges stabilizers in Ih give Klein four-groups 
 stabilizers of a pair of edges in I give Klein four-groups ; there are 5 of these, given by rotation by 180° in 3 perpendicular axes.
 stabilizers of a pair of edges in Ih give ; there are 5 of these, given by reflections in 3 perpendicular axes.

Face stabilizers 
Stabilizers of an opposite pair of faces can be interpreted as stabilizers of the anti-prism they generate.
 face stabilizers in I give cyclic groups C5
 face stabilizers in Ih give dihedral groups D5
 stabilizers of an opposite pair of faces in I give dihedral groups D5
 stabilizers of an opposite pair of faces in Ih give

Polyhedron stabilizers 
For each of these, there are 5 conjugate copies, and the conjugation action gives a map, indeed an isomorphism, .
 stabilizers of the inscribed tetrahedra in I are a copy of T
 stabilizers of the inscribed tetrahedra in Ih are a copy of T
 stabilizers of the inscribed cubes (or opposite pair of tetrahedra, or octahedra) in I are a copy of T
 stabilizers of the inscribed cubes (or opposite pair of tetrahedra, or octahedra) in Ih are a copy of Th

Coxeter group generators
The full icosahedral symmetry group [5,3] of order 120 has generators represented by the reflection matrices R0, R1, R2 below, with relations R02 = R12 = R22 = (R0×R1)5 = (R1×R2)3 = (R0×R2)2 = Identity. The group [5,3]+ of order 60 is generated by any two of the rotations S0,1, S1,2, S0,2. A rotoreflection of order 10 is generated by V0,1,2, the product of all 3 reflections. Here  denotes the golden ratio.

Fundamental domain 
Fundamental domains for the icosahedral rotation group and the full icosahedral group are given by:

In the disdyakis triacontahedron one full face is a fundamental domain; other solids with the same symmetry can be obtained by adjusting the orientation of the faces, e.g. flattening selected subsets of faces to combine each subset into one face, or replacing each face by multiple faces, or a curved surface.

Polyhedra with icosahedral symmetry 
Examples of other polyhedra with icosahedral symmetry include the regular dodecahedron (the dual of the icosahedron) and the rhombic triacontahedron.

Chiral polyhedra

Full icosahedral symmetry

Other objects with icosahedral symmetry 

 Barth surfaces
 Virus structure, and Capsid
 In chemistry, the dodecaborate ion ([B12H12]2−) and the  dodecahedrane molecule (C20H20)

Liquid crystals with icosahedral symmetry 

For the intermediate material phase called liquid crystals the existence of icosahedral symmetry was proposed by H. Kleinert and K. Maki
and its structure was first analyzed in detail in that paper. See the review article here.
In aluminum, the icosahedral structure was discovered experimentally three years after this
by Dan Shechtman, which earned him the Nobel Prize in 2011.

Related geometries 
Icosahedral symmetry is equivalently the projective special linear group PSL(2,5), and is the symmetry group of the modular curve X(5), and more generally PSL(2,p) is the symmetry group of the modular curve X(p). The modular curve X(5) is geometrically a dodecahedron with a cusp at the center of each polygonal face, which demonstrates the symmetry group.

This geometry, and associated symmetry group, was studied by Felix Klein as the monodromy groups of a Belyi surface – a Riemann surface with a holomorphic map to the Riemann sphere, ramified only at 0, 1, and infinity (a Belyi function) – the cusps are the points lying over infinity, while the vertices and the centers of each edge lie over 0 and 1; the degree of the covering (number of sheets) equals 5.

Similar geometries occur for PSL(2,n) and more general groups for other modular curves.

More exotically, there are special connections between the groups PSL(2,5) (order 60), PSL(2,7) (order 168) and PSL(2,11) (order 660), which also admit geometric interpretations – PSL(2,5) is the symmetries of the icosahedron (genus 0), PSL(2,7) of the Klein quartic (genus 3), and PSL(2,11) the buckyball surface (genus 70). These groups form a "trinity" in the sense of Vladimir Arnold, which gives a framework for the various relationships; see trinities for details.

There is a close relationship to other Platonic solids.

See also 
 Tetrahedral symmetry
 Octahedral symmetry
 Binary icosahedral group
 Icosian calculus

References 

  Translated in 
 
 
 
 Peter R. Cromwell, Polyhedra (1997), p. 296
 The Symmetries of Things 2008, John H. Conway, Heidi Burgiel, Chaim Goodman-Strauss, 
 Kaleidoscopes: Selected Writings of H.S.M. Coxeter, edited by F. Arthur Sherk, Peter McMullen, Anthony C. Thompson, Asia Ivic Weiss, Wiley-Interscience Publication, 1995,  
 N.W. Johnson: Geometries and Transformations, (2018)  Chapter 11: Finite symmetry groups, 11.5 Spherical Coxeter groups

External links
 
 THE SUBGROUPS OF W(H3)  (Subgroups of other Coxeter groups ) Gotz Pfeiffer

Finite groups
Rotational symmetry